Malik Muhammad Nawaz is a Pakistani politician who was a Member of the Provincial Assembly of the Punjab, from 2002 to May 2018.

Early life and education
He was born on 2 January 1970 in Faisalabad.

He has graduated in 1990 from University of the Punjab and has the degree of Bachelor of Arts.

Political career

He was elected to the Provincial Assembly of the Punjab as a candidate of Pakistan Muslim League (N) (PML-N) from Constituency PP-71 (Faisalabad-XXI) in 2002 Pakistani general election. He received 20,166 votes and defeated Muhammad Arshad, a candidate of Muttahida Majlis-e-Amal (MMA).

He was re-elected to the Provincial Assembly of the Punjab as a candidate of PML-N from Constituency PP-71 (Faisalabad-XXI) in 2008 Pakistani general election. He received 34,508 votes and defeated Haleem Aslam, a candidate of Pakistan Peoples Party (PPP).

He was re-elected to the Provincial Assembly of the Punjab as a candidate of PML-N from Constituency PP-71 (Faisalabad-XXI) in 2013 Pakistani general election. He received 56,007 votes and defeated an independent candidate, Muhammad Ud Din.

He was re-elected to the Provincial Assembly of the Punjab as a candidate of Pakistan Tehreek-e-Insaf (PTI) from Constituency PP-4 (Attock-IV) in 2018 Pakistani general election. He received 49,589 votes and defeated PML-N candidate, Sher Ali khan.

References

Living people
Punjab MPAs 2013–2018
1972 births
Pakistan Muslim League (N) politicians
Punjab MPAs 2002–2007
Punjab MPAs 2008–2013